Leon Francois Rautenbach (born 12 May 1972), popularly known as Frank Rautenbach, is a South African actor and producer. He is best known for the roles in the films Faith Like Potatoes, The Bang Bang Club and biographical film Hansie: A True Story.

Personal life
Rautenbach was born on 12 May 1972 in East London, South Africa.

He is married to production manager, Leigh Rautenbach since February 24, 1996.

Career
In 2006, he made film debut with Faith Like Potatoes directed by Regardt van den Bergh. The film is a biographical drama based on the book written by Angus Buchan. In 2008, he acted in the biographical sports film Hansie directed by van den Bergh. In the film he played the lead role of former South African cricketer Hansie Cronjé. After that success, he then made another lead role in The Bang Bang Club, a biographical film about the lives of four photojournalists active within the townships of South Africa during the apartheid period. The film received mixed reviews from critics.

In 2019, he acted in the martial arts crime drama television series Warrior by playing the role of "Patterson". The film became a blockbuster in that year. In 2020, he joined with the cast of popular soap opera 7de Laan and played the supportive role "Tiaan Terreblanche".

Filmography

References

External links
 IMDb

Living people
South African male film actors
1972 births
South African male television actors